Ten Nights in a Bar Room is a 1921 melodrama film directed by Oscar Apfel. The film is based on the novel of the same name by Timothy Shay Arthur.

Plot
Logging camp worker Joe Morgan becomes an alcoholic after a saloon opens up in town. His daughter Mary suffers as a result of this. One day, while Joe is at the saloon, his daughter Mary shows up to ask him to come home. A fight breaks out, and Mary is hit with a glass, killing her. Joe vows for revenge. After a series of misadventures, Joe stops trying to avenge his daughter's death, and he reunites with his wife.

Cast
 Baby Ivy Ward as Little Mary Morgan
 John Lowell as Joe Morgan
 Nell Clarke Keller as Fanny Morgan
 Charles Mackay as Simon Slade
 James Phillips as Frank Slade
 Ethel Dwyer as Dora Slade
 Charles Beyer as Harvey Green
 John Woodford as Judge Hammond
 Kempton Greene as Willie Hammond

References

External links
 
 
 
 

1921 films
American silent feature films
American black-and-white films
Silent American drama films
1921 drama films
Melodrama films
1920s American films
1920s English-language films